Popper's three worlds is a way of looking at reality, described by the British philosopher Karl Popper in a lecture given in August 1967. The concept involves three interacting worlds, called world1, world2 and world3.

Worlds 1, 2 and 3

These three "worlds" are not proposed as isolated universes but rather are realms or levels within the known universe.

Their numbering reflects their temporal order within the known universe and the fact the later realms emerged as products of developments within the preceding realms.

Popper's theory of these three "worlds" is crucially a cosmological theory. As is consistent with the known universe as presently described by the natural sciences, Popper maintains that the known universe did not contain any World2 or World3 at its inception - at its inception there was only a "World1", a realm where everything consisted of physical states and processes. Moreover that "World1" was for a very long time devoid of any living matter and so was for a very long time a World1 lacking any biological level. The biological level is a level within World1 that emerged from its physical-chemical evolution over a vast tract of time, as a lifeless universe eventually gave rise to living organisms, such as those on earth. In a similar sense to this emergence of life within World1 itself, Popper's maintains that "World2" later emerged as a product of biological evolution, and that subsequently "World3" emerged as a product of evolution within the human "World2". This cosmological approach is strongly opposed to any form of reductionism that might suggest we can ultimately explain whatever comes later in the known universe from what came before - against this, Popper argues that we should see the universe as creative and indeterministic in that it has given rise to genuinely new levels or realms - like biological life, "World2" and "World3" - that were not there from the beginning and which are not 'reducible' to what was there from the beginning.       

The three worlds may be understood, in this evolutionary and cosmological sense, as containing three categories of entity:

 World1: the realm of states and processes as studied by the natural sciences. These include the states and processes that we seek to explain by physics and by chemistry, and also those states and processes that subsequently emerge with life and which we seek to explain by biology.
 
 World2: the realm of mental states and processes. These include sensations and thoughts, and include both conscious and unconscious mental states and processes. World2 includes all animal as well as human mental experience. These mental states and processes only emerge as a product of biological activity by living organisms, and so only emerge subsequent to the emergence of living organisms within World1.

 World3: the realm of the 'products of thought' when considered as objects in their own right. These products emerge from human "World2" activity, but when considered as World3 objects in their own right they have rebound effects on human World2 thought processes. Through these rebound effects, World3 'objects' may - via World2-based human action on World1 - have an indirect but powerful effect on World1. In Popper's view, World3 'objects' encompass a very wide range of entities, from scientific theories to works of art, from laws to institutions.

Popper makes two key claims regarding the role of World3 in the known universe. First, Popper argues that, despite the many continuities and correspondences between the human and animal World2, (1) only humans consider their mental products as objects in their own right in a World3 sense and (2) only humans have access to World3 objects. Second, World3 has no direct effect on World1 but only affects World1 as mediated by the human World2: for example, a theory of nuclear reactions will never of itself cause a nuclear reactor to be built, yet we can only understand the existence of a nuclear reactor by understanding it is in reality not the result of a purely World1 process but is the product of a complex interaction between particular World3 theories and human World2 mental activity, and then particular World1 actions by humans arising from this complex interaction.

More on world3
Popper's world3 contains the products of thought. This includes abstract objects such as scientific theories, stories, myths and works of art. Popper says that his world3 has much in common with Plato’s theory of Forms or Ideas.  But, world3 is not to be conceived as a Platonic realm, because unlike the Platonic world of forms, which is non changing and exists independently of human beings, Popper's world3 is created by human beings and is not fixed. It corresponds to the current state of our knowledge and culture.

The interaction of world1 and world2
The theory of interaction between world1 and world2 is an alternative theory to Cartesian dualism, which is based on the theory that the universe is composed of two essential substances: res cogitans and res extensa. Popperian cosmology rejects this essentialism, but maintains the common sense view that physical and mental states exist, and they interact.

The interaction of world2 and world3
The interaction of world2 and world3 is based on the theory that world3 is partially autonomous. For example, the development of scientific theories in world3 leads to unintended consequences, in that problems and contradictions are discovered by world2. Another example is that the process of learning causes world3 to change world2.

The interaction of world3 and world1
The world3 objects are embodied in world1. For example, the intrinsic value of Hamlet as a world3 object is embodied many times in world1. But, this representation of an object of world3 in world1 is not considered an interaction in Popper's view. Instead, for Popper, because world3 is a world of abstractions, it can only interact with world1 through world2.

See also
 Eccles' philosophy
 Platonic realm
 Third Realm (Frege)
 Trichotomy (philosophy)
 Group mind
 Logical Investigations

Notes and abbreviated references

References

Further reading
 
 
 
 
 

Concepts in metaphysics
Reality
Karl Popper